Tryon's Rat Experiment is a psychology experiment conducted by Robert Tryon in 1940 and published in the Yearbook of the National Society for Studies in Education.

Experiment set-up 

Prior to Robert Tryon’s study of selective rat breeding, concluded in 1942, many psychologists believed that environmental, rather than genetic, differences produced individual behavioral variations.  Tryon sought to demonstrate that genetic traits often did, in fact, contribute to behavior.  To do so, Tryon created an experiment that tested the proficiency of successive generations of rats in completing a maze. He initiated the experiment by exposing a genetically diverse group of rats to the maze, labeling those who made the fewest errors “bright”, and those with the most errors “dull”.  Tryon then mated the “bright” males with “bright” females, and “dull” males with “dull” females.  After their children matured, Tryon repeated the maze test with them, and again separated the “bright” and the “dull”, again breeding “bright” with “bright” and “dull” with “dull”. Tryon continued this process for seven generations, creating two distinct breeds of “bright” and “dull” rats. In order to demonstrate that behavior had little effect on the genetically selectively bred rats, and lessen the chance of error when making his conclusions, Tryon cross-fostered the rats—that is, he had a “dull” mother raise “bright” children, and vice versa.  The independent variables in his experiment were the parental pairings, the choice of environment and parents for upbringing, and number of rats put through the maze. The dependent variable was the number of errors made by the rats in 19 trials of the maze.

Implications and conclusions 

While Tryon's results showed that the “bright" rats made significantly fewer errors in the maze than the “dull" rats did, the question exists of what other sensory, motor, motivational, and learning processes also influenced the results of the experiment.  A common misconception of this experiment and other similar experiments is that the observed change in the performance in the maze directly correlates with general learning ability.  This is not the case.  Rather, it has become a widely accepted belief among behavior geneticists that the superiority of the bright rats was confined to Tryon’s specific test; thus, it is not possible to claim that there is a difference in learning capacity between the two groups of rats.  Genetic variation, such as better peripheral vision, can make some rats “bright” and others “dull”, but does not determine their intelligence. Nonetheless, Tryon’s famous rat-maze experiment demonstrated that the difference between rat performances was genetic since their environments were controlled and identical.

See also 
Behavioural genetics
Nature and nurture
Artificial selection
Gene-environment interaction
Selective breeding

References

Further reading 

 Cooper & Zubek 1958, "Effects of Enrich and Restricted Early Environments on the Learning Ability of Bright and Dull Rats"

 Davis & Tolman 1924, "A Note on the Correlations Between Two Mazes"
 
 Heron 1933, "An Automatic Recording Device for Use in Animal Psychology"
 
 Heron 1935, "The Inheritance of Maze Learning Ability in Rats"
 
 Hamilton 1935, "The Association Between Brain Size and Maze Ability in the White Rat"
 
 Heron 1941, "The Inheritance of Brightness and Dullness in Maze Learning Ability in the Rat"
 
 Hirsch & Tryon 1956, "Mass Screening and Reliable Individual Measurement in the Experimental Behavior Genetics of Lower Organisms"
 
 Krechevsky 1933, "Hereditary Nature of 'Hypotheses'"
 
 Hall 1951, "The Genetics of Behavior" (inHandbook of Experimental Psychology', Stevens 1951)
 
 McClearn 1959, "The Genetics of Mouse Behavior in Novel Situations"
 
 McClearn 1962, "The Inheritance of Behavior"
 
 Hirsch et al 1967, _Behavior-Genetic Analysis_
 
 McClearn 1970, "Behavioral Genetics"
 
 Rosenthal, R, & Fode, K. (1963). "The effect of experimenter bias on the performance of the albino rat". Behavioral Science'', 8, 183-189.
 
 Stone & Nyswander 1927, "The Reliability of Rat Learning Scores from the Multiple-T Maze as Determined by Four Different Methods"
 
 Tolman & Jeffress 1925, "A Self-Recording Maze"
 
 Tolman & Nyswander 1927, "The Reliability and Validity of Maze-Measures for Rats"
 
 Tolman 1924, "The Inheritance of Maze-Learning Ability in Rats"
 
 Tryon 1930, "Studies in Individual Differences in Maze Ability, I: The Measurement of the Reliability of Individual Differences"
 
 Tryon 1931, "Studies in Individual Differences in Maze Ability, II: The Determination of Individual Differences by Age, Weight, Sex and Pigmentation"
 	
 Tryon 1931, "Studies in Individual Differences in Maze Ability, III: The Community of Function Between Two Maze Abilities"
 
 Tryon 1931, "Studies in Individual Differences in Maze Ability, IV: The Constancy of Individual Differences: Correlation between Learning and Relearning"
 	
 Tryon 1931, "Studies in Individual Differences in Maze Ability, V: Luminosity and Visual Acuity as Systematic Causes of Individual Differences and an Hypothesis of Maze Ability"
 
 Tryon 1939, "Studies in Individual Differences in Maze Ability, VI: Disproof of Sensory Components: Experimental Effects of Stimulus Variation"
 	
 Tryon 1940, "Studies in Individual Differences in Maze Ability, VII: The Specific Components of Maze Ability and a General Theory of Psychological Components"
 
 Tryon 1940, "Studies in Individual Differences in Maze Ability, VIII: Prediction Validity of the Psychological Components of Maze Ability"
 
 Tryon et al 1941, "Studies in Individual Differences in Maze Ability, IX: Ratings of Hiding, Avoidance, Escape, and Vocalization Responses"
 
 Tryon 1941 , "Studies in Individual Differences in Maze Ability, X: Ratings and Other Measures of Initial Emotional Responses of Rats to Novel Inanimate Objects"
 
 Tryon 1940, "Studies in Individual Differences in Maze Ability, XIII: Genetic Differences in Maze-Learning Ability in Rats"
 	
 Scott & Fuller 1965, Genetics and the Social Behavior of the Dog

Experimental psychology